Boheyr-e Sofla (also Romanized as Boḩeyr-e Soflá and Boḩeyr-e Soflā; also known as Bohair, Boḩer, and Būḩer) is a village in Mollasani Rural District, in the Central District of Bavi County, Khuzestan Province, Iran. At the 2006 census, its population was 40, in 8 families.

References 

Populated places in Bavi County